Justices of the North Carolina Supreme Court and judges of the North Carolina Court of Appeals are elected to eight-year terms in statewide judicial elections.  In 2006, all 
these races were non-partisan.  The 2006 congressional 
elections and the 2006 North Carolina 
legislative elections were held on the same day, November 7, 2006.

The result was that all incumbents except Linda Stephens were elected (if they had been appointed) or re-elected.  All the candidates supported by FairJudges.net, the first independent group to get involved in North Carolina's non-partisan judicial elections, won.

Supreme Court (Chief Justice)

Supreme Court (Timmons-Goodson seat)

Supreme Court (Martin seat)

Supreme Court (Wainwright seat)

Justice George L. Wainwright, Jr. retired, making this an open seat. Candidates Bill Gore, Jill Cheek, and Beecher "Gus" Gray were eliminated in a May primary election.

Court of Appeals (Hunter seat)

Candidate Bill Constangy was eliminated in a May primary election.

Court of Appeals (Stephens seat)

Candidate Christopher L. (Chris) Parrish was eliminated in a May primary election.

Notes

Sources
NC State Board of Elections

Judicial
2006